Thadikavagilu is a small village situated  away from Ramanagara and  from Magadi in the Ramanagara District of Karnataka State. It comes under the Jalamangala grama panchayat

The local language is Kannada.

Handicrafts are economically important. The main crops are millet, mango, coconut, and legumes. Domestic animals include sheep, goats, cows, and silkworms.

The village was founded c. 1925. The local school is the Government Senior Primary School Thadikavagilu, for grades 1-7.

References

Villages in Ramanagara district